Pristolepis fasciatus, commonly known as the Malayan leaffish, is a fish in the family Pristolepididae. It lives in the Mekong and Chao Phraya basins in Thailand, Cambodia, Vietnam, Myanmar, the Malay Peninsula, Sumatra, and Borneo, possibly also in southern India and China.

Anatomy and appearance
It can grow to  total length and reaches sexual maturity at a length of 7 to 8 cm.  The body is stocky, high and heavily flattened on the sides. The mouth is narrow, small and only slightly protractile (can be pushed forward). It is collected for the aquarium trade and also used as a food fish.

Ecology
It commonly inhabits slow-flowing and stagnant waters in medium-sized rivers, lakes, ponds and swamps and is mainly found near the banks where there is plenty of vegetation. In the Mekong region, it migrates to flooded fields during the rainy season and back to its home waters during the dry season. It feeds on algae, parts of plants, fruits, seeds, aquatic insects and small crustaceans.

References

Pristolepididae
Fish of the Mekong Basin
Freshwater fish of Borneo
Fauna of Sumatra
Fish of Cambodia
Freshwater fish of Indonesia
Fish of Laos
Freshwater fish of Malaysia
Fish of Myanmar
Fish of Thailand
Fish of Vietnam
Fish described in 1851
Taxa named by Pieter Bleeker